A witch is a practitioner of witchcraft.

Witch, WITCH, or variations thereof may also refer to:

Animals
 Witch (lefteye flounder) (Arnoglossus scapha), a Pacific flatfish
 Witch (righteye flounder) (Glyptocephalus cynoglossus), a European flatfish
 Araotes lapithis, the witch, a butterfly of India
 Megrim (Lepidorhombus whiffiagonis), sometimes known as witch

Arts, entertainment, and media

Comics
 W.I.T.C.H., an Italian fantasy comics series first published in 2001
 Witches (Marvel Comics), a 2004 supernatural comic book mini-series published by Marvel Comics
 Wytches (comics), a 2014 horror comic series by Scott Snyder and Jock

Fairy tales and literature
 Hag, or witch, a stock character in fairy tales
 The Witch (fairy tale), a Russian fairy tale
 The Witch (play), a 1616 play by Thomas Middleton
 "The Witch" (short story), an 1886 short story by Anton Chekhov
 The Witch, the English title of Anne Pederstotter (play) (1908)
 The Witches (novel), a children's book by Roald Dahl
 Witches (Discworld), witches as represented in Terry Pratchett's Discworld novels

Films 
 The Witch (1916 film), a lost American silent drama film
 Häxan, a 1922 Danish film, released in some English speaking countries as The Witches
 The Witch (1952 film), a Finnish horror film
 The Witch (1954 film), a West German drama film
 La strega in amore, a 1966 Italian drama-horror film  by Damiano Damiani also known as The Witch
 The Witches (1966 film), a British horror film
 The Witches (1967 film), an Italian film 
 The Witches (1990 film), a film based on Roald Dahl's book
 The Witch (2015 film), an American-Canadian horror film directed by Robert Eggers
 The Witch: Part 1. The Subversion, a 2018 South Korean action film
 The Witches (2020 film), a film based on Roald Dahl's book

Music

Groups
 Witch (band), a doom/stoner metal band formed in 2005
 Witch (Zamrock band), a 1970s Zambian rock band
 The Witches, a 90s Israeli, all-female alternative/heavy rock trio led by Inbal Perlmuter
 The Wytches, an English three-piece band
 David Ryder Prangley and the Witches, mid 2000s UK band formed by the former frontman of Rachel Stamp

Albums
Witch (Boyfriend EP)
Witch (Gangsta Boo & La Chat EP), 2014
 Wytches, a 1994 album by British rock band Inkubus Sukkubus
 The Witch (album)

Songs
 "The Witch", a 1970 single by The Rattles
 "The Witch" (song), a 1965 song by The Sonics
 "The Witch", a 2004 song by Insane Clown Posse
 "W.I.T.C.H." (song), a 2022 song by Devon Cole

Other uses in music
 The Witch, a side project of Cold (band) started in 2006
 The Witches (opera), a 2008 opera by Marcus Paus

Television
 W.I.T.C.H. (TV series), a 2004 television series based on the eponymous comic book
 "Witch" (Buffy the Vampire Slayer episode)
 Witch (Buffy the Vampire Slayer), witches as represented in the TV series

Video games
 W.I.T.C.H (video game), a 2006 platform game for the Xbox, PlayStation 2 and Game Boy Advance
 The Witch, a non-playable character in the Left 4 Dead series

Ships
Witch (catboat), a racing boat built in 1900
, the name of more than one ship of the Royal Navy
, a British destroyer in commission in the Royal Navy during the mid-1920s and from 1939 to 1945

Other uses
 The Witch (ballet), John Cranko's 1931 ballet to Maurice Ravel's Piano Concerto No. 2 in G Major
 WITCH (computer), an early Dekatron computer renamed the Wolverhampton Instrument for Teaching Computing from Harwell
 Witch (word), a word derived from the Old English nouns wicca ("sorcerer", "male witch") and wicce ("sorceress", "female witch")
 Greenwood Witch, ultralight aircraft
 The HalloWeekends Witch, a leader of the Screamsters during HalloWeekends at Cedar Point amusement park
 WITCH experiment, a particle physics experiment
 Women's International Terrorist Conspiracy from Hell (W.I.T.C.H.), an American feminist organization

See also

-wich or -wych, placename element in -wich towns in England
Witch Mountain (disambiguation)
Witchcraft (disambiguation)
Wych-elm, tree